Mulualem Girma Teshale (born December 9, 1987 in Ambo) is an Ethiopian swimmer. He competed at the 2012 Summer Olympics in the men's 50 metre freestyle event but did not qualify, finishing 57th overall.

References

1987 births
Living people
Ethiopian male swimmers
Olympic swimmers of Ethiopia
Swimmers at the 2012 Summer Olympics